Rohan O'Regan (born 19 December 1994) is an Australian rugby union player, currently playing for the San Diego Legion of Major League Rugby (MLR). His preferred position is flanker.

Professional career
O'Regan signed for Major League Rugby side San Diego Legion for the 2022 Major League Rugby season.

References

External links
itsrugby.co.uk Profile

1994 births
Living people
Rugby union flankers
Australian rugby union players
Sydney Stars players
New South Wales Country Eagles players
Ealing Trailfinders Rugby Club players
San Diego Legion players